Tabaré Abayubá Silva Aguilar (born 30 August 1974) is a Uruguayan football manager and former player who played as a defender.

Playing career
Silva started his playing career in 1993 with Defensor Sporting Club, he soon won a call up to the Uruguay national team and in 1995 he was part of the team that won the Copa América. he also played in 1997 Copa América.

In 1998, he moved to Spain where he played for Sevilla, Levante and Elche.

In 2003, he returned to Uruguay where he played for a number of different teams, including Central Español, Sud América, River Plate de Montevideo, Rampla Juniors and Villa Española.

International career
Silva made his debut for the Uruguay national football team on October 19, 1994 in a friendly match against Peru (0-1 win) in the Estadio Nacional José Díaz in Lima, Peru. He earned a total number of 19 caps for his native country, scoring no goals.

Coaching career
Silva debuted as a manager with Sud América in 2010.

On 26 June 2012, it was announced that he will coach his favourite team: Defensor Sporting.

National football team titles

Club titles

References

External links

 Profile at Tenfield

1974 births
Living people
Uruguayan footballers
Uruguay under-20 international footballers
Uruguay international footballers
1995 Copa América players
1997 Copa América players
Association football defenders
Defensor Sporting players
Sevilla FC players
Levante UD footballers
Elche CF players
Central Español players
Club Atlético River Plate (Montevideo) players
Rampla Juniors players
Villa Española players
Sud América players
Uruguayan Primera División players
Segunda División players
Uruguayan expatriate footballers
Expatriate footballers in Spain
Uruguayan football managers
El Tanque Sisley managers
Defensor Sporting managers
Oriente Petrolero managers
S.D. Quito managers
Expatriate football managers in Bolivia
Copa América-winning players
C.D. Cuenca managers
Cusco FC managers